Per Odeltorp, known as Stig Vig, (19 November 1948 – 23 January 2012 in Stockholm) was a Swedish singer and bassist well known for being the leader of the rock band Dag Vag.

Vig died at his home at the age of 63 on January 23, 2012.

References

1948 births
2012 deaths
Swedish male singers